Héctor Olivera may refer to:

 Héctor Olivera (film director) (born 1931), Argentine film director, producer and screenwriter
 Héctor Olivera (baseball) (born 1985), Cuban baseball player